The Yazidism in Russia refers to believers of Yazidism in Russia. This community is part of the Yazidis who emigrated to Russia from the Armenian and Georgian parts of the Soviet Union after the collapse of the Soviet Union in the 1990s. In 2009, the Yazidis were recognized as a religious community in Russia.

Demographics 
Most Yazidi habit in large cities such as St.Petersburg, Moscow or Nizhny Nowgorod among others. According to the Russian Census in 2010, the total number of Yazidis in Russia in 2010 was 40,586.

Media 
The satellite channel of Lalish TV broadcast in Kurdish from Moscow and is bankrolled by the Yazidi businessman Mirza Sloyan. It was launched in April 2016 and is located in the shopping mall Shengal, which takes its name from a place Yazidi live in Iraq.

Notable persons 
Mikhail Aloyan (* 1988), Boxer

See also 
Yazidis in Armenia
Yazidis in Georgia

References 

Yazidis in Russia
Ethnic groups in Russia
Religion in Russia
Yazidi diaspora